Buffalo Tennis and Squash Club is a historic clubhouse building in Buffalo in Erie County, New York. It was built in 1915–1916 and is a -story, Classical Revival–style building with a hipped roof. It is constructed of hollow tile and is sheathed in stucco with brick quoins. The original building was enlarged with the addition of two doubles squash courts in 1929. A second tennis court was added in 1968.

It was listed on the National Register of Historic Places in 2008. It is located in the Elmwood Historic District–West.

References

Clubhouses on the National Register of Historic Places in New York (state)
Neoclassical architecture in New York (state)
Buildings and structures completed in 1916
Buildings and structures in Buffalo, New York
National Register of Historic Places in Buffalo, New York
Historic district contributing properties in Erie County, New York